Goux-sous-Landet is a commune in the Doubs department in the Bourgogne-Franche-Comté region in eastern France.

It is located on the D110 route, south of Courcelles.

Population

See also
 Communes of the Doubs department

References

Communes of Doubs